Anna Borkowska may refer to:

 Anna Borkowska (Sister Bertranda) (1906–1988), Polish nun and anti-Nazi resistance member
 Anna Borkowska (actress) (died 2008), Iranian actress